The 1928 Campeonato Carioca, the 23rd edition of that championship, kicked off on April 8, 1928 and ended on October 21, 1928. It was organized by AMEA (Associação Metropolitana de Esportes Atléticos, or Metropolitan Athletic Sports Association). Eleven teams participated. América won the title for the 4th time. No teams were relegated.

Participating teams 

After its suspension in 1927, Syrio e Libanez appealed against it, with the appeal being accepted when the 1928 championship had already begun, and as such, Syrio e Libanez only joined the championship in the Second round.

System 
The tournament would be disputed in a double round-robin format, with the team with the most points winning the title.

Championship

References 

Campeonato Carioca seasons
Carioca